Clytie terrulenta is a moth of the family Erebidae first described by Hugo Theodor Christoph in 1893. It is found in the Near East and Middle East.

There are multiple generations per year. Adults are on wing from March to May.

The larvae probably feed on Tamarix species.

External links

Image

Ophiusina
Moths of Asia
Moths of the Middle East
Moths described in 1893